Hildegunn is a given name. Notable people with the given name include:

Hildegunn Eggen (born 1953), Norwegian actress
Hildegunn Gjertrud Hovdenak (born 1985), Norwegian racing cyclist
Hildegunn Mikkelsplass (born 1969), Norwegian biathlete
Hildegunn Øiseth (born 1966), Norwegian jazz musician